Heterosexuality is the eighth studio album by American singer-songwriter Shamir. It was released on February 11, 2022, by AntiFragile Music.

Composition
Heterosexuality is an industrial, synth-pop, avant-garde pop, noise pop, indie rock, shoegaze, and lo-fi album with influences from R&B, dream pop alternative rock, alt-pop,  industrial rap, new jack swing, tropicália, bossa nova, lounge pop, and art punk.

Lyrically, the album's ten tracks tell a narrative cycle, beginning with songs about a trio of songs about "aggressive nonconformity as a political statement". On "Stability", Shamir expresses how that fight can take a toll and "unearths traumas, both universal ones and his own unique struggles". The album then "moves into a false, saccharine golden hour" with lyrics about "helplessness hardening into nihilism". On the last two songs, Shamir "entertains the slightest possibility of hope" and the fight returns.

Reception 

 AnyDecentMusic? has an average of 7.7 of 10 from 14 ratings.

AllMusic's Heather Phares says "While its seeming contradictions make it a slightly more challenging listen than Shamir was, Heterosexuality acknowledges how complicated just existing can be with the wit, creativity, and unguarded emotions that have been a vital part of Shamir's music since the beginning." The A.V. Clubs Max Freedman writes "Now that [Shamir]'s growing to love himself, he can finally start loving other people anew, too. It's been a long time coming, but Heterosexuality is an engaging way for it to arrive." DIYs Ben Tipple says the album "provides space for a poignant message, one that supersedes outdated expectations." Exclaim!s Rachel Kelly writes that "Shamir is economical with this album — not a bar or lyric is wasted, every moment is carefully curated to hit exactly where it needs to. This precision is why the album works so beautifully. Heterosexuality captivates and transports the listener, making an ethereal landscape out of dissonance and nihilism. It never repeats itself, it does not stutter, and it absolutely never apologizes."

The Line of Best Fits Sam Franzini says "Heterosexuality is an interesting title choice for an album for which norm-subverting is wholly within the music; it'd be like Björk titling an album Disco. But this album has it all, and listeners who crave forward-thinking, statement-making pop will find homes with "Gay Agenda", "Cisgender", and "Abomination", while those less involved can relax with the jams of "Cold Brew", "Nuclear", and "Stability"". Loud and Quiets Guia Cortassa writes that "there's more than enough to be mesmerised by in the multifaceted talent of this chameleonic artist." Pitchforks Peyton Thomas says the album "stands as a powerful alternative to the zero-calorie pride anthems that pepper the pop charts every June."

Year-end lists

Track listing

Personnel 
 Shamir Bailey – vocals, guitar (2, 4–6, 8–10), bass (4, 5, 8–10)
 Hollow Comet – producer, guitar (2, 5, 8, 9)
 Justin Tailor – mixing engineer
 Ryan Schwabe – mastering engineer
 Kyle Pulley – recording engineer (2, 4, 5, 7–10)
 Danny Murillo – assistant recording engineer (4, 5, 7–10), drums (4, 5, 9, 10), bass (10), Rhodes piano (10)
 Eric Bogacz – vocal producer (1, 2, 7)

References 

2022 albums
Shamir (musician) albums
Industrial albums by American artists
Synth-pop albums by American artists
Indie rock albums by American artists
Noise pop albums
Avant-pop albums
Lo-fi music albums
Shoegaze albums by American artists
LGBT-related albums